Gerda Maria Terno (10 July 1909 - 31 July 1995) was a German stage and film actress. She starred in the 1941 Nazi propaganda film Blood-Brotherhood and made other sporadic film appearances although much of her work was in the theatre. She was also a noted voice actress, dubbing foreign films for release in Germany.

Selected filmography
 Yvette (1938)
 Bachelor's Paradise (1939)
 The Leghorn Hat (1939)
 My Daughter Doesn't Do That (1940)
 Blood-Brotherhood (1941)
 Melody of a Great City (1943)
 A Man With Principles? (1943)
 Derby (1949)

References

Bibliography 
Giesen, Rolf. ''Nazi Propaganda Films: A History and Filmography. McFarland & Co, 2003.

External links 
 

1909 births
1995 deaths
German stage actresses
German film actresses
Actresses from Berlin
20th-century German actresses